The 2016–17 Moldovan "A" Division was the 26th season of Moldovan football's second-tier league. Fifteen teams competed in this division, including reserve sides from top-flight Divizia Națională teams. The season began on 5 August 2016 and ended on 31 May 2017.

Spicul Chișcăreni were the defending champions, after winning their first title in the competition in the previous season.

Teams

Season summary

League table

Results

Top goalscorers

References

External links
Divizia A - Moldova - Results, fixtures, tables and news - divizia-a.md

Moldovan Liga 1 seasons
2
Moldova 2